Heart*Iz (stylized in all caps, pronounced "heart eyes") is the second extended play (EP) by South Korean–Japanese girl group Iz*One, a project group formed through the 2018 Mnet reality competition show Produce 48. The EP was released on April 1, 2019 by Off the Record Entertainment. It is available in two versions: "Violeta" and "Sapphire", and consists of eight tracks with "Violeta" serving as its lead single.

Background and release
The music video for the lead single "Violeta" was released on April 1, 2019 on YouTube, alongside the physical and digital release of the EP through various music sites.

Off the Record released a special video in commemoration of achieving 40 million views for "Violeta" music video.

Promotion
A comeback showcase, entitled "Heart To", was held at the Blue Square on the same day as the album's release, where Iz*One performed the songs from the EP for the first time. It was broadcast live via Mnet and Stone Music's YouTube channel. The group recorded for variety show Idol Room and was broadcast on JTBC on April 2, 2019.

Commercial performance
On March 29, 2019, Off the Record reported that the pre-order sales for Heart*Iz had surpassed 200,000 copies. The EP sold 132,109 copies in the first week, setting a new record for the highest number of sales for girl groups in its first week of release at the time. Heart*Iz subsequently topped in both Gaon Album and Oricon Overseas Album Charts.

Awards and nominations

Track listing

Charts

Weekly charts

Year-end charts

Certifications and sales

Release history

See also
 List of Gaon Album Chart number ones of 2020
List of K-pop albums on the Billboard charts

References

Iz*One albums
2019 EPs
Korean-language EPs